Ryukyuan pottery (琉球焼, or Okinawan language: 焼物 ; Yachimun) include earthenware and stoneware items that are traditionally made on the Ryukyu Islands in east Asia.

History 
Ryukyuan pottery first appeared during the Gusuku period (c. 1100s-1400s), when it was introduced from China.

Tsuboya became the centre of production in 1682 after the kilns of Chibana, Wakuta, and Takaraguchi were consolidated under the Ryukyu Kingdom government. The two sub-types of Tsuboya ware were the generally unglazed Ara-yachi and the glazed Jō-yachi.

Most of the kilns had to move out of Tsuboya after the end of the Pacific War due to the smoke they produced. Production moved to the villages of Yuntan and Ujimi and they continued the tradition of Yachimun.

In addition to dishes, vessels, and roof tiles, Ryukyuan pottery is especially known for the production of funerary urns, and shisa, lion-like guardians placed on rooftops and at gates to protect homes and other spaces from evil spirits.

References

Further reading 
 Michiaki, Kawakita ... [et al.], Craft treasures of Okinawa, translated and adapted by Erika Kaneko, Kodansha International, Tōkyō, 1978
 Publication Committee of the art of Okinawa, The art of Okinawa: Pottery, Okinawa Times Co, 1989
 Stockton, Elizabeth, Traditions of Tsuboya, Ryukyu Bunka-sha, Naha, 197-
 Suzuki, Hisao, Sugimura, Tsune, Living crafts of Okinawa, Weatherhill, New York; Tōkyō, 1973
 Tsuboya Pottery Museum, Guidebook of the Permanent Exhibitions, Naha Municipal Tsuboya Pottery Museum, 2000
 Uemura, Masami, A Potter Jiro Kinjo, Okinawa, Japan, 1988

External links 

Okinawan culture
Japanese pottery
Ryukyu Kingdom